Jean Fanor (born June 17, 1989) is an American football safety who is currently a free agent. He played college football at Bethune-Cookman. Fanor was signed by the Kansas City Chiefs as an undrafted free agent in 2012. He has also been a member of the Tampa Bay Storm, Green Bay Packers and Toronto Argonauts.

Early years
Jean Fanor is of Haitian descent. Fanor played high school football for the North Miami High School Pioneers.

College career
Fanor continued his football career for the Bethune-Cookman Wildcats from 2007 to 2011. Fanor played running back, wide receiver and defensive back as a freshman and sophomore before being made strictly a safety his final 3 season. He missed his senior season due to injury, where he redshirted, and played his final season as a redshirt-senior. As a senior, he was second on the team in tackles with 73, also had 3 interceptions, and 2 forced fumbles that earned him second-team all conference honors.

Professional career

Kansas City Chiefs
Fanor was signed by the Kansas City Chiefs after going undrafted in the 2012 NFL Draft. Fanor played 3 preseason games with the Chiefs before he was waived.

Tampa Bay Storm
Fanor was assigned to the Tampa Bay Storm in November 8, 2012. Fanor had a solid rookie season, posting 6 interceptions for the Storm. In 2014, Fanor recorded 111 tackles.

Green Bay Packers
Fanor was signed to the Green Bay Packers' practice squad on December 17, 2014. On September 5, 2015, he was released by the Packers during final team cuts.

Toronto Argonauts
Fanor was signed by Toronto Argonauts on March 3, 2016. He was released by the Argonauts on May 4, 2016.

References

External links
Green Bay Packers bio
Bethune-Cookman Wildcats bio

1989 births
Living people
Haitian players of American football
Players of American football from Florida
American football safeties
American football linebackers
Bethune–Cookman Wildcats football players
Kansas City Chiefs players
Tampa Bay Storm players
Toronto Argonauts players
Green Bay Packers players